Patronus may refer to:
 The patronus (Latin) or patron in ancient Roman society; see Patronage in ancient Rome
 The apparition produced by the Patronus Charm in Harry Potter